Powerman may refer to:

 Powerman Duathlon, running and cycling competition
 Powerman Zofingen, Powerman Duathlon Championships in Switzerland
 Powerman 5000, an alternative rock band
 "Powerman", a song by The Kinks from Lola versus Powerman and the Moneygoround, Part One
 Powerman (comics), a British publication
 PowerMAN, PC power management software
 Matt Alaeddine, a contortionist with many stage names including Powerman
 Wheels on Meals, a 1984 Hong Kong film sometimes marketed under the title Powerman

See also
 Power Man (disambiguation)